Sungai Batu is an archaeological site in Kuala Muda District, Kedah, Malaysia.

Site description 
Archaeologists have found remains possibly belonging to the Kedah Kingdom. Among these ruins are the remains of stone buildings and what may be a boat. Remains from the smelting of iron, including a large clay furnace, have also been found.

Arthur Demarest of the Vanderbilt Institute of Mesoamerica commented that the city most likely gained power because "any civilization that has iron will win the war because they have efficient tools".

Archaeological discoveries 

The current date of the Sungai Batu ancient civilization predates the founding of Ancient Rome, making it one of the oldest civilizations in Southeast Asia. The excavation in Sungai Batu started from a request made by the National Heritage Department (JWN) for the Global Archaeological Research Center (PPAG), Universiti Sains Malaysia (USM) to complete the Bujang Valley area data. This request was made due to the record in Geographike Hyphegesis. In it Ptolemy, stated there was a trading system between the Western and Eastern worlds through the Golden Chersonese (Golden Peninsula) route, better known as Malay Peninsula in the 1st century.

Findings from archaeological excavations indicate the existence of ancient port center and trade activities. The discovery of building ruins such as ancient jetties, administrative building walls and unique local ritual sites remnants using brick-building foundations show evidence that the local community at that time had high skills in infrastructure and building architecture. In 2015, archaeologists in Sungai Batu managed to find several ancient ships buried at the bottom of the lake around the excavation area.

External records 

Apart from archaeological findings, external records were also found proving the existence of the early Sungai Batu civilization. Among these are:
 Arab records (Hoyland and Gilmour 2006; Krenkow, 1936; Rahman, 1955,1959)
 Tamil records (Nilakanta Sastri, 1038,1949; Thani Nagayam, 1968)
 Al-Kindi
 Al-Biruni

In external records, the name of the area of the early Sungai Batu civilization is known through the dialect of the record writer. Among other names for the area of the early Sungai Batu civilization are Kalah, Kataha or Kataram, and Queada. In Al-Kindi 's record in the 9th century it was also mentioned that "the best quality swords are made of Yemeni iron, Qalai (Kalah) and Hindi."

 
 فالعتيق ينقسم ثلاثة أقسام أولها وأجودها اليماني ثم ثانيها القلعي ثم ثالثها الهندي

Economic based civilization 

The early civilization of Sungai Batu was known as a place for smelting iron and wrought iron was used as merchandise. The iron smelting industry is also supported by a network of ports for export purposes within and outside the peninsula. With the discovery of iron smelting furnaces and tuyere, this proved that during the early civilization of Sungai Batu became the focus place for iron trade from other civilizations around the world. Around the excavation area there is also a dumping of iron ore and tuyere. The forged irons were exported to the Western and Eastern worlds via ancient waterways using merchant ships.

The main use of forged iron is to the manufacture weapons because of their good quality. The quality of iron exported from the early civilization of Sungai Batu is self-recognized by Al-Biruni when he mentions the sword of Qala (Kalah) where the original place of the iron used.

Ritual site 

The construction of brick blocks and having a round structure is a unique form of ritual site compared to other ritual sites from other civilizations. Researchers found the ritual site to be local in nature and thought it was built by a local community that once lived at that time. This proves that the local community at that time already had high skills 

Islamic, Buddhist and Hindu archaeology expert Prof Derek Kennet of University of Durham noted that Indian temple architecture could still be seen in the brick layers of the square platform. While it was “highly unusual” to see a Hindu temple on top of the round base of a Buddhist stupa, it was not impossible either.

Kennet described the wall contours on the square platform, containing ledges, overhangs and a circular bulge, as the unmistakable wall architecture of ancient Indian temples.

Prof Dr Nasim Khan from Peshawar University, Pakistan, said the ritual site in Sungai Batu needed further excavations.

Researchers also argue that before the advent of Islam in the 12th century in Kedah and Hindu-Buddhism in the 5th century, ritual sites in Sungai Batu were used for the practice of animism. This is because the circular structure found at the ritual site has the characteristics of animism for the worship at Mount Jerai which is located in the northern part of the area.

Tourism 
The discovery of Sungai Batu has caused a significant reaction from the Malaysian public and government. Kedah Tourism and Heritage committee chairman Mohd Rawi Abdul Hamid said that the discovery of this site would cause the Kedah province to "become a magnet for the international tourism sector". The site also gained interest from the archaeological community.

References 

Kuala Muda District
History of Malaysia
Archaeological sites in Malaysia